Martinsburg is an unincorporated community in Jackson Township, Washington County, in the U.S. state of Indiana.

History
Martinsburg was founded in 1818 by Dr. Abner Martin, and named for him.

A post office was established at Martinsburg in 1830, and remained in operation until it was discontinued in 1919.

Geography

References

Unincorporated communities in Washington County, Indiana
Unincorporated communities in Indiana
Louisville metropolitan area
Populated places established in 1818
1818 establishments in Indiana